The National Patriotic Front is a political party in Namibia.

In the 2000s the party was dormant until it was revived for the 2019 Namibian general election. One of the party's primary platforms is representation of veterans who fought for the South West African Territorial Force (SWATF) and other divisions of the South West African security forces during the Namibian War of Independence. The party seeks to get these former service members classified officially as war veterans by the Namibian government, a recognition afforded only to former insurgents of the People's Liberation Army of Namibia (PLAN).  the party has no official leadership beyond Uapiruka Papama, its acting secretary-general. The NPF failed to achieve parliamentary representation after it finished last in the national assembly election, gathering 1,785 votes (0.22%). It did not field a presidential candidate.

History
It was formed in March 1989 at the initiative of Moses Katjioungua as an alliance of the Action National Settlement, South West African National Union and Caprivi African National Union political parties. Katjioungua was elected to the Constituent Assembly of Namibia, the 1st National Assembly of Namibia and the 2nd National Assembly of Namibia. The early party leaders included ANS leader Eben van Zijl and CANU leader Siseho Simasiku.

See also

:Category:National Patriotic Front (Namibia) politicians
List of political parties in Namibia

References

20th century in Namibia
Political parties established in 1989
Political party alliances in Namibia